Helen Bianchin (born 20 February 1939) is a New Zealand-born Australian writer. Since 1975, she has written over 55 romance novels for Mills & Boon.

Biography
Bianchin was born on 20 February 1939 in New Zealand. She worked as a legal secretary, then spent two years working and travelling in Australia. In Cairns, she met Danilo Bianchin, an Italian from Treviso; six months later, they married. They had one daughter, Lucia, and two sons Angelo and Peter. Since 1981, the family has resided in Australia.

Bibliography

Single Novels
 The Willing Heart (1975)
 Bewildered Haven (1976)
 Avenging Angel (1977)Harliquin Romance #2084
 Hills of Home (1978)Harliquin Romance #2175
 Vines in Splendour (1978)
 Stormy Possession (1979)
 Edge of Spring (1979)
 Master of Uluru (1980)Harliquin Romance #2378
 Devil in Command (1980)
 Savage Touch (1981)
 Wildfire Encounter (1982)
 Savage pagan (1984)
 Yesterday's Shadow (1984)
 Sweet Tempest (1984)
 Dark Tyrant (1984)
 Bitter Encore (1985)
 Dark Enchantment (1986)
 An Awakening Desire (1987)
 Touch the Flame (1989)
 The Tiger's Lair (1990)
 The Stefanos Marriage (1990)
 No Gentle Seduction (1991)
 Reluctant Captive (1992)
 Stormfire (1992)
 Passion's Mistress (1994)
 Dangerous Alliance (1994)
 Desert Mistress (1996)
 The Bridal Bed (1998)
 A Convenient Bridegroom (1999)
 Mistress by Arrangement (1999)
 Mistress by Contract (2001)
 The Husband Test (2001)
 The Wedding Ultimatum (2002)
 The Pregnancy Proposal (2003)
 In the Spaniard's Bed (2003)
 The Spaniard's Baby Bargain (2004)
 His Pregnancy Ultimatum (2004)
 The Disobedient Bride (2005)
 The Greek's Bought Wife (2005)
 Purchased by the Billionaire (2006)
 The High-Society Wife (2006)
 The Marriage Possession (2007)
 The Greek Tycoon's Virgin Wife (2007)
 The Italian's Ruthless Marriage Command (2009)
 Bride, Bought and Paid for (2009)
 The Andreou Marriage Arrangement (2010)
 Public Marriage, Private Secrets (2010)
 Alessandro's Prize (2011)
 Alexei's Passionate Revenge (2016)

Santanas Brothers Series
 Forgotten Husband (1995)
 The Marriage Arrangement (2001)

Marriages Series
 An Ideal Marriage? (1997)
 The Marriage Campaign (1998)

Lanier Series
 The Marriage Deal (2000)
 The Husband Assignment (2000)

Dimitriades Series
 A Passionate Surrender (2002)
 The Greek Bridegroom (2002)

Year Down Under Series Multi-Author
No Gentle Seduction (1991)

Forbidden! Series
Desert Mistress (1996)

Do Not Disturb Series Multi-Author
The Bridal Bed (1998)

Expecting! Series Multi-Author
The Pregnancy Proposal (2003)
His Pregnancy Ultimatum (2004)

Wedlocked! Series Multi-Author
Purchased by the Billionaire (2006)
The Marriage Possession (2007)

Collections
 Forgive and Forget (1998)
 Forgotten Husband / Desert Mistress (2004)
 Willing Heart / Ideal Marriage? (2005)

Omnibus in Collaboration
 Romance on Holiday (1983) (with Vanessa James, Carole Mortimer and Celia Scott)
 Avenging Angel / Sown in the Wind / Cruise to a Wedding (1985) (with Jean S. MacLeod and Betty Neels)
 Christmas Affairs (1998) (with Sharon Kendrick and Sandra Marton)
 The Australians (2000) (with Miranda Lee and Margaret Way)
 The Greek Tycoons (2001) (with Lynne Graham and Michelle Reid)
 Weddings Down Under (2001) (with Jessica Hart and Margaret Way)
 Australian Attraction (2002) (with Miranda Lee)
 Wedding Countdown (2002) (with Liz Fielding and Kim Lawrence)
 Australian Playboys (2003) (with Marion Lennox and Margaret Way)
 Foreign Affairs (2004) (with Anne Mather and Michelle Reid)
 Coming Home (2004) (with Lucy Gordon and Rebecca Winters)
 Coming Home for Christmas (2003) (with Lucy Gordon and Rebecca Winters)
 Claiming His Mistress (2004) (with Lucy Gordon and Sharon Kendrick)
 A Convenient Proposal (2004) (with Lucy Gordon and Kate Walker)
 His Boardroom Mistress (2005) (with Sandra Marton and Cathy Williams)
 Her Greek Millionaire (2005) (with Helen Brooks and Sara Wood)
 Latin Affairs (2006) (with Sharon Kendrick and Kathryn Ross)
 Convenient Weddings (2006) (with Jacqueline Baird and Kathryn Ross)
 Gorgeous Greeks (2007) (with Julia James)

References

1939 births
New Zealand emigrants to Australia
Australian romantic fiction writers
Australian women novelists
Living people
Women romantic fiction writers